Conor Collins is a visual artist based in Manchester.

Career 
Conor Collins is known for making artworks using unconventional materials such as diamond dust, blood, and hate speech found on social media.

Works by Conor Collins include his portrait of Tom Daley made using the hate speech he received when he came out, his portrait of Alan Turing made using blood of gay and bisexual medical professionals banned from donating under UK blood donation laws, his portrait of Caitlyn Jenner made using the hate speech she received when she came out as transgender, his portraits of Trump both before and after the election made using direct quotes from Donald Trump, and in 2018 his portrait of Princess Diana made using diamond dust and HIV positive blood.

References

External links 

 

British multimedia artists
English LGBT artists
Artists from Manchester
Year of birth missing (living people)
Living people
21st-century LGBT people